Ain Matvere (born 13 January 1967 – 14 May 2018) was an Estonian badminton player.

He was born in Tartu.

He began his badminton career in 1978, coached by Mart Siliksaar. He is multiple-times Estonian champion. 1983–1989 he was a member of Estonian national badminton team.

Since 1989 he worked as a badminton coach. Students: Kati Tolmoff.

In 1984 he was named as Best Badminton Player of Estonia.

References

1967 births
2018 deaths
Soviet male badminton players
Estonian male badminton players
Sportspeople from Tartu